Bela is an administrative subdivision (tehsil) of Lasbela District in the Balochistan province of Pakistan. The tehsil is administratively subdivided into five Union Councils and is headquartered at the town of Bela.

References

Tehsils of Lasbela District